Panania, a suburb of local government area City of Canterbury-Bankstown, is located 23 kilometres inner south-west of the Sydney central business district, in the state of New South Wales, Australia, and is a part of the South-western Sydney region. The postcode is 2213, which it shares with adjacent suburbs East Hills and Picnic Point.

Panania is bounded on the north by the M5 South Western Motorway and the suburb of Milperra.  Picnic Point, to the south, features parklands along the Georges River. East Hills is the suburb to the west and Revesby is located to the east.

History

The name Panania was on the original list of stations proposed for the Tempe-East Hills railway line in 1929. Prior to this, Panania was part of what was generally known as the East Hills district. Panania is an Aboriginal word meaning sun rising in the east and shining on the hills. An alternative theory is that the name may be a derivation of "Pannonia", which was an ancient province of the Roman Empire southeast of the Danube River. During the construction of the railway line the name Nioka was used for the station which is an Aboriginal word meaning the green hill. Other names suggested for suburb were Linden Park and Elmswood.

The arrival of the railway in 1931 stimulated the development of the East Hills district. Prior to this, the district was rural. There was a soldiers' settlement at Milperra which consisted mostly of poultry and horticultural enterprises. The only public transportation was a bus service to Bankstown railway station on the Bankstown line from various locations throughout the district, which posed a great inconvenience to people who needed to visit the Sydney CBD for work.

Development began apace after World War II. The Australian Legion of Ex-Servicemen and Women sponsored the mass production of housing at Panania beginning from 1946 with the construction of 34 houses.

St Christopher's Catholic Church on Tower Street was originally the Panania Star cinema. Panania North Public School, a short two block walk on the northern side of the railway line, became a demonstration school in the late 1970s so that trainee teachers from the newly established Milperra College of Advanced Education could observe teachers at work.

Commercial area
Panania has a shopping area adjacent to Panania railway station. It runs along Weston Street, Anderson Avenue and Tower Street. Anderson Avenue features several local government facilities including a senior citizens centre and a public library. Panania Hotel is located on the northern side of Panania railway station.

The active Business Chamber is a significant strength of Panania.

Transport

Panania railway station is on the Airport & South Line of the Sydney Trains network. Parts of Panania are serviced by buses operated by Transdev NSW, generally following the routes established by McVicar's Bus Services.

The East Hills railway line, which originally terminated one stop away at East Hills divided the suburb into two distinct precincts. During the 1980s, the railway line was extended with a rail bridge over the Georges River to Campbelltown.

Demographics

Employment
At the 2006 census, 45.6% of Panania's population were employed.

Religious affiliation

Churches

Panania features notable buildings such as Holy Trinity Anglican Church and St Christopher's Catholic Church. St Christopher's is housed in the building formerly known as the Panania Star Cinema. The Panania Star Cinema was built in 1952 in the Art Deco style, and was the twin of the Padstow Star Cinema in nearby Padstow. The building retains a number of original features, including a decorative ceiling. After a grant from the Roman Catholic Archdiocese of Sydney and many donations from parishioners, the building underwent renovations costing $165,000 which were completed early in 2006.

The Salvation Army also has a Corps in Panania. The old building was recently refurbished.

Panania Uniting Church, was established in the early 1950s and moved to its current location at 206 Marco Ave, Panania in 1967.

Schools
East Hills Girls Technology High School 
East Hills Boys High School (est. 1955)
Panania Public School
Panania North Public School
Tower Street Public School
St Christopher's Catholic School

Houses
Panania is mostly a residential suburb, which was developed after World War II and originally contained many modest freestanding bungalows built from asbestos cement sheeting (commonly known as fibro). Today, many of these houses have been rebuilt as larger residences or two-storey duplex houses.

Notable residents
 Paul Abrahams, bass player for The Reels
 Actor Bryan Brown
 Col Joye, singer-songwriter 
 Paul Makin, journalist
 Ron Raper, rugby league player 
 Andrew and Michael Tierney from Human Nature
 Steve Waugh and Mark Waugh, former Australian cricketers

Politics
Panania is in the Banks electorate for federal politics the local member is David Coleman (LP). For state politics Wendy Lindsay (LP) is the member for East Hills.

References

Suburbs of Sydney
City of Canterbury-Bankstown